Trochotoma is a genus of large sea snails, marine gastropod mollusks in the family Pleurotomariidae, the slit snails.

Species
The following species were brought into synonymy:
Trochotoma crossei de Folin, 1869: synonym of Sinezona cingulata (O. G. Costa, 1861)

References

External links
 To World Register of Marine Species

Pleurotomariidae
Monotypic gastropod genera